The Greater Mindanao shrew (Crocidura grandis) is a species of mammal in the family Soricidae. It is endemic to the Philippines. Its natural habitat is subtropical or tropical dry forests.

References 

Crocidura
Mammals of the Philippines
Endemic fauna of the Philippines
Fauna of Mindanao
Mammals described in 1911
Taxonomy articles created by Polbot